Spotify Kids is a mobile app that allows children to browse Spotify while providing their parents with parental controls. The app also includes curated content for children such as audiobooks, lullabies, and bedtime stories. Only subscribers to Spotify's Premium Family subscription plan can access the app, which has been described as a method of boosting subscriptions to the plan.

Function 
Spotify Kids is a mobile app that allows children to browse Spotify with parental controls. Using the app, parents can view their children's listening history, block specific songs, and share playlists with their children. The app also includes sing-along songs, playlists designed for young children, and curated audiobooks, lullabies, and bedtime stories. Access is included in Spotify's Premium Family subscription plan, and is exclusive to subscribers to the plan. Users can configure the app for a specific age group upon first launch.

The playlists on Spotify Kids are curated by groups including Discovery Kids, Nickelodeon, Universal Pictures, and The Walt Disney Company. All content on the Spotify Kids app is curated by editors. , there were roughly 8,000 songs available on the platform.

The design of the Spotify Kids app is colorful, and user interface varies depending on the age group for which the app is configured.

Purpose 
Spotify Kids is designed to follow regulations about consent and data collection for applications used by children. TechCrunch described it as "largely designed to boost sign-ups for Spotify’s top-tier subscription, the $14.99 (USD) per month Premium Family plan."

Release 
Spotify Kids is available for iOS and Android. After being beta tested in Ireland in October 2019, it was released as a beta across the United Kingdom on February 11, 2020. It was later released in Sweden, Denmark, Australia, New Zealand, Mexico, Argentina, and Brazil. On March 31, 2021, it was made available in France, Canada, and the United States.

References

External links 

 

Kids
Mobile applications
IOS software
Android (operating system) software
Mobile music apps
Music streaming services
Children's entertainment